Glen Francis Filley (born December 20, 1899) was an American football and basketball coach. He served as the head football coach at McKendree College—now known as McKendree University—in Lebanon, Illinois from 1925 to 1929.  Filley was also the head basketball coach at McKendree from 1925 to 1930, tallying a mark of 42–44.

Head coaching record

College football

References

 

1899 births
Year of death missing
Basketball coaches from Missouri
McKendree Bearcats athletic directors
McKendree Bearcats football coaches
McKendree Bearcats men's basketball coaches
Missouri Wesleyan Owls football players
High school football coaches in Nebraska
People from Cameron, Missouri